Ptychodes politus is a species of beetle in the family Cerambycidae. It was described by Audinet-Serville in 1835. It is known from Guatemala, Costa Rica, El Salvador, Mexico, Panama, Honduras, Belize, and Nicaragua.

Subspecies
 Ptychodes politus lecontei Thomson, 1856
 Ptychodes politus politus Audinet-Serville, 1835

References

Lamiini
Beetles described in 1835